Ephedra foliata is a species of gymnosperm in the Ephedraceae family. It is referred to by the common name shrubby horsetail. It is native to North Africa, and Southwest Asia, from Morocco and Mauritania east to Turkmenistan, Pakistan, and Punjab State in India.

Taxonomy
Ephedra foliata was originally described by Pierre Edmond Boissier, later validly published by Carl Anton von Meyer in 1846, and placed in section Pseudobaccatae (=sect. Ephedra), "tribe" Scandentes by Otto Stapf in 1889. In 1996 Robert A. Price classified E. foliata in section Ephedra without recognizing a tribe.

References

External links

foliata
Flora of the Arabian Peninsula
Flora of Western Asia
Flora of North Africa
Flora of the Indian subcontinent
Plants described in 1846
Taxa named by Pierre Edmond Boissier
Taxa named by Carl Anton von Meyer